Ritmo, Amor e Palavras (literally, "Rhythm, Love and Words" or R.A.P.) is Boss AC's third album. It was released in December 2005 in Portugal. It is Boss AC's most successful album and one of the greatest successes in Portuguese music in 2005. It is one of the biggest selling Portuguese hip hop albums and was awarded gold in August 2005 for selling 10,000 copies and later platinum after selling 30,000 copies.

The album was recorded at Hightower Productions in New York City. It was mastered by Jim Brick.

Nomination
The album was nominated for Best Portuguese Act at the 2005 MTV Europe Music Awards.

Track listing

Credits
 All tracks produced by Boss AC, except "Só Preciso De Cinco Minutos", by Sam The Kid
 Boss AC - executive producer
 Recorded by AC at NoStress Studio, Troy Hightower at Hightower Productions Inc (NY), Luís Caldeira at Estúdio Valentim de Carvalho and Jorge Cervantes at Estúdio Andinos
 Mixed by Troy Hightower at Hightower Productions Inc and AC at NoStress Studio
 Mastered by Jim Brick at Absolute Audio, New York
 Roda Dentada - writer
 Náná Sousa Dias - photographer

References

2005 albums
Boss AC albums